James Gray Denton (May 27, 1917 – June 10, 1982) was a justice of the Supreme Court of Texas from January 1, 1971 to June 10, 1982, died in office.

References

Justices of the Texas Supreme Court
1917 births
1982 deaths
20th-century American judges